Silas Hoadley (1786 – December 28, 1870) was an American clockmaker.

Biography
Hoadley was born in Bethany, Connecticut on January 31, 1786. He was a cousin of the architect and builder David Hoadley. He received little formal education before becoming apprentice carpenter to his uncle Calvin Hoadley. In 1809 his apprenticeship ended, and he formed a clock-making partnership in Plymouth, Connecticut with Eli Terry and Seth Thomas as Terry, Thomas & Hoadley.

The partners gradually withdrew to create their own firms – Terry in 1810, Thomas in 1814 – leaving Silas Hoadley as sole owner. He continued to make mantel and tall clocks until 1849.

Hoadley was a Freemason of high standing and one of the most respected and oldest members of Harmony lodge, No. 42 F. and A. M. having been intimately associated with the lodge in Watertown, Connecticut in 1817. his lodge bears testimony that "His heart was in the right place, with a hand as open as the day to meeting charity, of him it may be truly said an honest man is the noblest work of god".

Hoadley was elected to the Connecticut General Assembly several times, and in 1844 to the Connecticut State Senate. He died at Plymouth, Connecticut.

Family life
Hoadley was married to Sarah N. Painter; they are buried together in West Cemetery, and share a stone. They had five children.

Death
Hoadley died on December 28, 1870, and is interred at West Cemetery in Plymouth, Connecticut.

References

External links
 Early American Craftsmen

 

American clockmakers
1786 births
1870 deaths
People from Bethany, Connecticut
People from Plymouth, Connecticut